Cristian Ștefan Raiciu (born 3 July 1996) is a Romanian professional footballer who plays as a midfielder. Raiciu started his career at Concordia Chiajna, team for which he also made the Liga I debut and played subsequently for Rapid București and Steaua II București.

References

External links
 
 

1996 births
Living people
Footballers from Bucharest
Romanian footballers
Association football midfielders
Liga I players
CS Concordia Chiajna players
Liga II players
FC Rapid București players
CS Pandurii Târgu Jiu players
FC Steaua II București players
FC Dunărea Călărași players